Jonas Wille (born 20 May 1976) is a Norwegian former handball player and current coach of the Norwegian national team.

From September 2021 to April 2022 he was the assistant coach to Christian Berge of the Norwegian national team.

References

1976 births
Living people
Norwegian male handball players
Norwegian handball coaches
People from Halden
Norwegian expatriate sportspeople in Denmark
Norwegian expatriate sportspeople in Sweden
Handball coaches of international teams